Polyrhachis aedipus is a species of ant in the subfamily Formicinae, found in Sri Lanka. They are known to be diurnal.

References

External links

 at antwiki.org
Animaldiversity.org
Itis.org

Formicinae
Hymenoptera of Asia